Mihai Poalelungi (born 13 September 1962) is a Moldovan jurist and former judge. He served as the President of the Constitutional Court of Moldova from 2018 until his resignation in June 2019.

References 

Living people
1962 births
Constitutional Court of Moldova judges
People from Criuleni District